Orino may refer to:

Orino, Lombardy, comune of Varese, Lombardy, Italy
Orino, Kavala, a former village in Greece
Orino (river), Ticino, Switzerland
Oreino, Lasithi, a village in Crete, Greece
Orino, Japan, a city in Japan